The J&S Hunter Coupe was a fibreglass kit car made in the 1960s by J&S Fibreglass, a small company that specialised in making various removable hard tops and other kit cars including the J&S Beach Buggy, their most successful model. The company was located in Five Dock, Sydney. It ceased to trade some years ago.

Approximately 20 body shells and chassis units were made. The last was recorded in 1968.

Various motors and components were fitted to the cars. The most common version was fitted with Holden straight-six motor and chassis components. Other known variants include two cars fitted with Jaguar 3.4 litre engines coupled with some Studebaker suspension components, another was fitted with a Ford Zephyr V6 engine. 

One of the Jaguar engined cars was built by Ken Anderson on the farm at Gilgandra. It had fully independent wishbone suspension and disc brakes front and rear, and was fitted with overdrive. The chassis was enhanced with a steel backbone enclosing the driveline. It was used for personal transport for 5 years until a high speed encounter with some sheep. The final pictures can be seen on Facebook under J&S Hunter.

Several cars were raced. The most famous was built by Ian & Jill Hindmarsh of Kiama. Hindmarsh was a skilled motor mechanic and the car that he built up was presented exceptionally well. As a result, the car featured in all of the J&S promotional materials and brochures. The Hindmarsh Hunter was raced in various club events and was quite successful from 1962 to 1966. In Easter 1965 the car was raced at Mount Panorama Circuit  recording a maximum speed of 125 mph on Conrod Straight. In mid 1965 the Hindmarsh Hunter was fitted with a new Holden 179 engine and raced at Warwick Farm Raceway.

Kit cars